Lars-Erik Bengtsson (born 28 May 1942) is a retired Swedish freestyle swimmer who won the European title in the 4×200 m freestyle relay in 1962. He competed at the 1960 Summer Olympics in the 1500 m and 4×200 m events and finished sixth in the relay.

References

1942 births
Living people
Swedish male freestyle swimmers
Olympic swimmers of Sweden
Swimmers at the 1960 Summer Olympics
European Aquatics Championships medalists in swimming
SK Neptun swimmers